Ban Phan Thom is a community and a khwaeng (sub-district) of Phra Nakhon District, Bangkok.

History
Ban Phan Thom is a traditional community since the early Rattanakosin period alike Ban Bu and Ban Chang Lo in Thonburi's Bangkok Noi District, Ban Bat and Ban Dok Mai of Pom Prap Sattru Phai District, as well as Ban Chang Thong on Ti Thong Road etc. They are all communities of craft artisans since ancient times.

For Ban Phan Thom was a community having been set up since the early Rattanakosin period by people from Nakhon Si Thammarat in southern region. The community, built up from their household member's cooperation, was called "Ban Phan Thom" because of its specialization in making Khrueang Thom (nielloware), either for household utensils for decorations. During King Narai the Great's regin of Ayutthaya Kingdom, niellowares were presented to King Louis XIV of France as the royal gift, showing that nielloware exclusively belonged to the high ranking elite's uses in the past. However, there is just only one household  left in the area today which still inherits the traditional technique and process of making nielloware like in the old days.

The entrance of Ban Phan Thom community is located on the Phra Sumen Road near Saphan Wan Chat Intersection and Palace Gate Remnants in Bang Lamphu neighbourhood opposite to Wat Bowonniwet.

Geography
Neighboring sub-districts are (from north clockwise): Bang Khun Phrom, Wat Sommanat of Pom Prap Sattru Phai District, Bowon Niwet, Talat Yot, Chana Songkhram, and Wat Sam Phraya.

Places

Ministry of Agriculture and Cooperatives
Ratchadamnoen Avenue (section outer Ratchadamnoen)
Wat Pari Nayok Worawihan
Wat Tri Thotsathep Worawihan
Wat Mai Armataros
Phra Sumen Road
Sam Sen Road
King Taksin Shrine
Chao Pho Nu Shrine
Khlong Bang Lamphu
Phan Fa Lilat Bridge

References

Subdistricts of Bangkok
Phra Nakhon district